Kathlyn Fares (born September 7, 1942) is an American politician who served in the Missouri House of Representatives from the 91st district from 2001 to 2009.

References

1942 births
Living people
Republican Party members of the Missouri House of Representatives
Women state legislators in Missouri